Ett hus med många rum is a studio album from Swedish dansband Kikki Danielssons orkester, formerly known as Kikki Danielsson & Roosarna. It was released in November 1997.

Track listing

Svensktoppen
Four of the songs were tested for the Swedish hitlist Svensktoppen.

Kärlekens vindar
"Kärlekens vindar" was on Svensktoppen during the period 21 June-26 July 1997. The song was on Svensktoppen for five weeks, with a 4th place as best result there.

Tjejer
"Tjejer" was on Svensktoppen during the period 13 September-4 October 1997. The song was on Svensktoppen for three weeks, with an 8th place as best result there.

Ett hus med många rum
The title track "Ett hus med många rum", written by Lasse Holm and Ingela "Pling" Forsman, is a peace song which was made for the year 2000. The song was on Svensktoppen during the period 3–17 January 1998. The song was on Svensktoppen for three weeks, with a 6th place as best result there.

Kärleken har fått vingar
"Kärleken har fått vingar" was on Svensktoppen during the period 21 March-2 May 1998. The song was on Svensktoppen for six weeks, with a 5th place as best result there.

References

1997 albums
Roosarna albums